The Pancyprian Gymnasium (Greek: Παγκύπριον Γυμνάσιον) is the oldest still operational high school in Cyprus, founded in 1812.

History 
In the same location as the current school there was an older school established in 1753 known as Ellinomouseion (Ελληνομουσείον). The Pancyprian Gymnasium was founded in 1812 by Archbishop Kyprianos at a time when Cyprus was still under Ottoman rule. It was originally called the Hellenic School of Nicosia (Ελληνική Σχολή Λευκωσίας) and is the oldest high school still in operation on the island. The school was expanded in 1893, by the initiative of Archbishop Sophronius III, to incorporate a lyceum when Cyprus was under British rule, therefore making it equal to Greek high schools and its students were eligible to study at the University of Athens. In 1894 aside from the secondary school, a school for primary school teachers was founded, the Didaskaleio (Διδασκαλείο). In 1896 it changed its name to its current one. The first principal of the Gymnasium in 1893 was Delios Ioannis.

Students of the school have fought in the Greco-Turkish War of 1897, the Balkan Wars and participated in the EOKA struggle.

In tribute to the school's contribution to education the Cyprus Post office issued a commemorative stamp in 1993.

Grounds
It is located opposite the archbishopric within the walls of the old city of Nicosia. The original building was destroyed in a fire in 1920 and parts of the school were completely rebuilt in neoclassical style. Of particular historical interest is the crypt of the school located beneath the main entrance. This is where Archbishop Kyprianos was said to have held secret meetings with representatives of the Philiki Etairia in the early 19th century. The school also incorporates a substantial collection of artifacts, art and books. The Severios Library which opened in 1949 holds over 60,000 manuscripts.

Through benevolent donations the school has become very wealthy. On an educational level it is highly regarded and considered a model school. Many influential figures have studied and taught here.

Notable former pupils
 Archbishop Makarios, past president of Cyprus
 Athanasios Papageorgiou, Byzantine archaeologist, director of the Department of Antiquities
 Tassos Papadopoulos, past president of Cyprus
 Costas Clerides, attorney general of Cyprus
 Glafkos Clerides, past president of Cyprus
 Petros Clerides, former attorney general of Cyprus
 Vassos Lyssarides, politician and leader of the Socialist Party
 Christopher A. Pissarides, Nobel Prize-winning economist
 Kypros Chrysanthis, writer and doctor
 Vassos Karageorghis, director of the Department of Antiquities

Notable teachers
 Chrysostomos I 1961 to 1966, theology teacher
 Dimitris Lipertis, poet, French teacher 1910-1912
 Lawrence Durrell English teacher, 1953 to 1956.
 Konstantinos Spyridakis, teacher, writer, minister of Education
 Adamantios Diamantis, painter
 Telemachos Kanthos, painter
 Menelaos, Markides, first curator of the Cyprus Museum
 Kypros Chrysanthis, writer and doctor

References

External links

 Pancyprian Gymnasium Website
 More information on Pancyprian Gymnasium 

Educational institutions established in 1812
High schools and secondary schools in Cyprus
Education in Nicosia
1812 establishments in the Ottoman Empire